The fourth season of the British-American animated sitcom The Amazing World of Gumball, created by Ben Bocquelet, aired on Cartoon Network in the United States, and was produced by Cartoon Network Development Studio Europe. The series focuses on the misadventures of Gumball Watterson, a blue 12-year-old cat, along with his adopted brother, Darwin, a goldfish. Together, they cause mischief among their family, as well as with the wide array of students at Elmore Junior High, where they attend middle school. The season began filming on January 6, 2015, and ended filming on April 28, 2016.

The season had an average of 1.356 million viewers per episode, a decrease from previous seasons, Season 1(1.998), Season 2(1.712), and Season 3(1.937).

Production
The season was written by Ben Bocquelet, Louise Coats, Mic Graves, Andrew Jones, Ciaran Murtagh, Joe Parham, Tobi Wilson, Timothy Mills, Richard Preddy, Nathan Auerbach, Daniel Berg, Joe Parham, Mark Evans Ciaran Murtagh, Tom Neenan, Andy Wolton, Oliver Kindeberg, Matt Zeqiri, Phil Whelans, Guillaume Cassuto, Joe Markham, John Sheerman, Rikke Asbjoern, James Hamilton, and James Huntrods, and was storyboarded by Adrian Maganza, Aurelie Charbonnier, Chuck Klein, Wandrille Maunoury, Akis Dimitrakopoulos, Yani Ouabdesselam, and Oliver Hamilton

Episodes

Notes

References

4
2015 American television seasons
2015 British television seasons
2016 American television seasons
2016 British television seasons